Siolius is a genus of beetles in the family Noteridae, containing the following species:

 Siolius amazonicus J.Balfour-Browne, 1969
 Siolius bicolor J.Balfour-Browne, 1969
 Siolius clayae J.Balfour-Browne, 1969

References

Noteridae